Can't Stop the Music is a 1980 American musical comedy film directed by Nancy Walker. Written by Allan Carr and Bronté Woodard, the film is a pseudo-biography of the 1970s disco group the Village People loosely based on the actual story of how the group formed. Produced by Thorn EMI Screen Entertainment (formerly EMI Films), distributed by independent distributor Associated Film Distribution (AFD), the film was released after disco's peak and, along with Xanadu, is known for inspiring the creation of the Golden Raspberry Awards, winning the first Razzies for Worst Picture and Worst Screenplay.

Plot
Songwriter Jack Morell—a reference to Village People creator Jacques Morali—gets a break DJing at local disco Saddle Tramps. His roommate, Samantha "Sam" Simpson, is a supermodel newly retired at the peak of her success. She sees the response to a song that he wrote for her ("Samantha") and agrees to use her connections to get him a record deal. Her connection is her ex-boyfriend Steve Waits, president of Marrakech Records—a reference to Village People record label Casablanca Records—who is more interested in rekindling their romantic relationship than in Jack's music (and more interested in taking business calls than in wooing Samantha), but agrees to listen to a demo.

Deeming Jack's vocals as inadequate, Sam recruits neighbor and Saddle Tramps waiter/go-go boy Felipe Rose (the Indian), fellow model David "Scar" Hodo (the construction worker, who daydreams of stardom in the solo number "I Love You to Death"), and finds Randy Jones (the cowboy) on the streets of Greenwich Village, offering dinner in return for their participation. Meanwhile, Sam's former agent, Sydney Channing, orders Girl Friday Lulu Brecht to attend, hoping to lure back the star. Ron White, a lawyer from St. Louis, is mugged by an elderly woman on his way to deliver a cake that Sam's sister sent and arrives disconcerted. Brecht gives Jack drugs, which unnerves him when her friend Alicia Edwards brings singing cop Ray Simpson (the policeman), but Jack records the quartet on "Magic Night". Ron, pawed all night by the man-hungry Brecht, is overwhelmed by the culture shock of it all and leaves.

The next day, Sam runs into Ron, who apologizes, proffers the excuse that he is a Gemini and follows her home. Spilling leftover lasagna on himself, Sam and Jack help him remove his trousers before Jack leaves and Sam and Ron spend the night. Newly interested in helping, Ron offers his Wall Street office to hold auditions. There, Glenn M. Hughes (the leatherman), climbs atop a piano for a rendition of "Danny Boy", and he and Alex Briley (the G.I.) join the group, now a sextet. They get their name from an offhand remark by Ron's socialite mother Norma. Ron's boss, Richard Montgomery, overwhelmed by the carnival atmosphere, insists that the firm not represent the group, and Ron quits.

Ron's new idea for rehearsal space is the YMCA (the ensuing production number "YMCA" features its athletic denizens in various states of undress; the film is one of the few non-R-rated offerings to feature full-frontal male nudity). The group cuts a demo ("Liberation") for Marrakech, but Steve sees limited appeal and Sam refuses his paltry contract. Reluctant to use her savings, they decide to self-finance by throwing a pay-party.

To bankroll the party, Sam acquiesces to Channing's plea to return for a TV advertising campaign for milk, provided the Village People are featured. The lavish number "Milkshake" begins as Sam pours milk for six little boys in the archetypal costumes with the promise that they will grow up to be the Village People. The advertisers want nothing to do with such a concept and refuse to broadcast the spot. Norma then steps in to invite the group to debut at her charity fundraiser in San Francisco. Sam lures Steve by promising a romantic weekend, but the inference that she would proceed with the seduction takes Ron aback, and Sam ends their romantic relationship. On his private jet, Steve prepares for a tryst, but rather Jack and his former chorine mother Helen arrive to negotiate a contract. Initially reluctant, Helen wins over Steve with her kreplach, and eventually they are negotiating the T-shirt merchandising for the Japanese market.

In the dressing room before the show, Ron, relieved to learn that Sam did not travel with Steve, proposes to her. At one point, Montgomery appears, seeking to rehire Ron as a junior partner representing the group. Following a set by The Ritchie Family ("Give Me a Break"), the Village People triumphantly debut ("Can't Stop the Music").

Cast

 Steve Guttenberg as Jack Morell
 Valerie Perrine as Samantha "Sam" Simpson
 Caitlyn Jenner as Ron White
 Paul Sand as Steve Waits
 Tammy Grimes as Sydney Channing
 Village People:
 Alex Briley as Alex the G.I.
 David Hodo as David the Construction Worker
 Glenn Hughes as Glenn the Leatherman
 Randy Jones as Randy the Cowboy
 Felipe Rose as Felipe the Indian
 Ray Simpson as Ray the Policeman
 June Havoc as Helen Morell
 Barbara Rush as Norma White
 Altovise Davis as Alicia Edwards
 Marilyn Sokol as Lulu Brecht
 Russell Nype as Richard Montgomery
 Jack Weston as Benny Murray
 Leigh Taylor-Young as Claudia Walters
 Dick Patterson as the Record store manager

Production

Development
Originally titled Discoland... Where the Music Never Ends, Can't Stop the Music was a fictionalised account of the formation of the Village People. Allan Carr announced the film in June 1979, describing it as "Singing in the Rain for the disco crowd" and stating that the film would star the Village People, Valerie Perrine, Tammy Grimes, Chita Rivera, Barbara Rush, Pat Ast and Bruce Jenner. It was to be the first in a three picture slate from Carr, the others including Chicago and The Josephine Baker Story starring Diana Ross. Filming was to start on August 20 of that year and was financed by EMI, then under the aegis of Barry Spikings. When asked why EMI were making a film about disco so long after Saturday Night Fever, Spikings said, "I hope it is different. The film breaks new ground."

The film's director, Nancy Walker, a theater, film, and television star since the 1940s, had been nominated for two Tonys, four Golden Globes, and eight Emmys. Walker had guest starred as Rhoda's mother Ida Morgenstern in several episodes of The Mary Tyler Moore Show and continued that role in its spin-off Rhoda. After establishing the character, Walker directed some episodes of both series, along with episodes of other sitcoms. Can't Stop the Music was her lone effort at theatrical film direction, as after it, Walker returned to acting in television.

Casting
The film's supporting cast includes Tammy Grimes, Russell Nype, June Havoc, Altovise Davis, Jack Weston and Leigh Taylor-Young. Chita Rivera and Pat Ast were initially cast but dropped out of the film's production.

Can't Stop the Music was Caitlyn Jenner's film debut (as Bruce Jenner), after becoming famous for three world record-setting performances in the Decathlon, and a Gold medal win at the 1976 Olympic Games. Jenner's record stood from 1975 until shortly before this film's 1980 release. Jenner did not appear in another film until Adam Sandler's Jack and Jill (2011), which, like Can't Stop the Music, won the Golden Raspberry Award for Worst Picture. Carr said, "Jenner is going to be the Robert Redford of the 80s, and this film will do for Valerie what Carnal Knowledge did for Ann-Margret."

The Village People auditionees depicted in the film included Blackie Lawless (a member of the glam-punk group New York Dolls and heavy metal group W.A.S.P.) and James Marcel (who would later find greater success with the name James Wilder). Background dancers included Perri Lister, girlfriend of Billy Idol and mother to his son, and Peter Tramm, who would go on to appear in dozens of music videos and double for Kevin Bacon in Footloose.

Ray Simpson's role was originally intended for Victor Willis, the original lead singer of the Village People who left the group during pre-production of this film. Morali had hired Willis' then-wife, Phylicia Ayers-Allen, to portray his girlfriend. When Willis left the group, Ayers-Allen quit the movie and was replaced by Altovise Davis.

"This movie's a revolution," said Carr. "I mean this movie is launching whole new careers and we need new stars today. Warren and Ryan and Redford - these people are way over 40."

Carr had attempted to cast Olivia Newton-John in this film as Samantha, but after discussions between her producer, John Farrar, and Morali over who would write Newton-John's numbers, Newton-John instead signed on to play the lead in Xanadu. "It wasn't only money," said Carr, "it was creative control and other demands."

Filming
The schedule of the film was 11 weeks: eight in Los Angeles, two in New York and one in San Francisco. A proposed week of filming on Fire Island was scrapped due to fear of the weather. Carr was coming off a massive worldwide hit with the pop musical Grease when shooting took place between May and July 1979 at the height of the disco craze. Carr took a hands-on role with the production, and personally directed and cast the male athlete extras for the "YMCA" musical sequence.

Shooting took place at MGM Studios in Culver City, California, with location shooting in New York City and San Francisco. Location shooting in New York was somewhat complicated by adjacent protests by gay activists over the William Friedkin film Cruising (starring Al Pacino), which was filming on location nearby. The two productions were mistaken for each other more than once, with protestors disrupting the Can't Stop the Music location shoots when they had intended to halt production of Cruising. A few weeks prior to release, Jenner and Perrine hosted a TV special, Allan Carr's Magic Night, to promote the film.

Tensions between Walker and Perrine rose on the set to the point that Walker would not be present for scenes featuring Perrine, leaving director of cinematography Bill Butler to direct in her place. Additionally, Perrine was reportedly unhappy that a dance number in which she performed was cut from the film.

Carr said he decided to change the title during filming because, as the music score included older ballads and Broadway numbers, it would be inaccurate to call it Discoland. However, the decision was made shortly after Disco Demolition Night, which effectively ended the popularity of the genre. During filming, sales for the Village People's albums started to decline and disco became increasingly unfashionable. "They'll still be hot," said Carr of the Village People. "If not I will resurrect them." Two of the band's three biggest hits, "In the Navy" and "Macho Man," do not appear in the film, though Perrine wears a T-shirt emblazoned with the words "Macho Woman" as she jogs through the men's locker room at the YMCA. Another reference to one of the band's songs, "San Francisco (You've Got Me)," appears in the opening credits, as Jack passes a group of three women with the words "San Francisco" printed on their T-shirts.

The band's silver and white costumes in the "Milkshake" sequence and red costumes in the finale sequences were designed by Theoni V. Aldredge.

Music
 "The Sound of the City" - David London
 "Samantha" - David London
 "I Love You to Death" - Village People
 "Sophistication" - The Ritchie Family
 "Give Me a Break" - The Ritchie Family
 "Liberation" - Village People
 "Magic Night" - Village People
 "Y.M.C.A." - Village People
 "Milkshake" - Village People
 "Can't Stop the Music" - Village People

Jack's song "Samantha" is credited in the film as being sung by David London, a pseudonym for rock singer Dennis "Fergie" Frederiksen, who was the lead singer for several popular rock bands during the 1980s whose biggest success came as one of the lead singers on TOTO's Isolation record released in 1984. London/Frederiksen also sings a second song on the soundtrack, "The Sound of the City".

While the film's soundtrack album contains the 10 songs from the film, the incidental score by Morali and Belolo was released on LP only in Australia. One of the songs in the film's background score is the instrumental backing track of "Like an Eagle," a hit song by another Casablanca Records artist, Dennis Parker.

Release
By the time of the film's release during the summer of 1980, the disco genre had not only peaked in the United States but also was experiencing a backlash there. As a result, the film received scathing reviews from critics and performed poorly at the box office. At a cost estimated at $20 million, the film was a colossal failure financially, bringing in only a tenth of that in gross revenue, and is considered one of the reasons for the downfall of AFD. "Our timing was wrong, and in this business, timing is everything," wrote Lew Grade, who invested in the movie. The soundtrack album was better received, and while it reached only No. 49 in the U.S. (the first Village People album not to go Gold), it reached No. 9 in the UK and No. 1 in Australia. The film itself also performed well in Australia, where the world premiere preview was shown at the Paramount Theatre, Sydney on June 1, 1980, with the after party held at Maxy's. The BBC bought the film for two showings for $3.5 million, which caused much controversy at the time, while ABC in America paid $6 million.

Carr's next film, Grease 2, brought in more than twice as much on its opening weekend as this film grossed in its entire run. Even though it was considered a failure, Grease 2 nearly made back its investment in its U.S. gross alone.

Baskin-Robbins Ice Cream sold a flavor called "Can't Stop the Nuts" as part of the promotion of the film.

Critical response
Can't Stop the Music received generally negative reviews from critics. On Rotten Tomatoes it has an approval rating of 18% based on 17 reviews, with an average rating of 3.1/10. 
The New York Times gave the film a scathing review, calling it "thoroughly homogenized". Variety magazine felt likewise, writing "The Village People, along with ex-Olympic decathlon champion [Caitlyn] Jenner, have a long way to go in the acting stakes." Nell Minow of Yahoo! Movies called the film "an absolute trainwreck of a movie", but that it had "some hilariously campy moments." Gene Siskel and Roger Ebert selected the film as one of their "dogs of the year" in a 1980 episode of Sneak Previews.

Accolades
Can't Stop the Music was the first winner of the Worst Picture Golden Raspberry Award, for it was a double feature of this and Xanadu that inspired John J. B. Wilson to start the Razzies. The film is listed in Wilson's book The Official Razzie Movie Guide as one of "The 100 Most Enjoyably Bad Movies Ever Made".

Home media
Can't Stop the Music was released on Region 1 DVD by Anchor Bay Entertainment, under license from StudioCanal on April 16, 2002. Shout Factory released a Blu-ray edition on June 11, 2019.

See also
Other films released during the late 1970s disco period
 Saturday Night Fever (1977)
 FM (1978)
 Thank God It's Friday (1978)
 Sgt. Pepper's Lonely Hearts Club Band (1978)
 Roller Boogie (1979)
 Skatetown, U.S.A. (1979)

Notes

References

External links

 
 
 Official Trailer
 Detailed review of the film

 

1980 films
1980 LGBT-related films
1980s musical comedy films
American LGBT-related films
American musical comedy films
1980s English-language films
Films directed by Nancy Walker
Films produced by Allan Carr
Films set in New York City
Films set in San Francisco
Films shot in Los Angeles
Films shot in New York City
Films shot in San Francisco
Gay-related films
Jukebox musical films
LGBT-related musical comedy films
Films with screenplays by Allan Carr
Films with screenplays by Bronte Woodard
Village People
EMI Films films
1980 directorial debut films
1980 comedy films
Disco films
Golden Raspberry Award winning films
1980s American films